Julius Schwyzer (27 September 1876 – 6 February 1929) was a Swiss sculptor. His work was part of the art competitions at the 1924 Summer Olympics and the 1928 Summer Olympics.

References

1876 births
1929 deaths
19th-century Swiss sculptors
20th-century Swiss sculptors
Swiss sculptors
Olympic competitors in art competitions
People from Nottwil
20th-century Swiss male artists